The Joseph Mandl House is a house located at 800 N. Fillmore St. in Jerome, Idaho. It was listed on the National Register of Historic Places on September 8, 1983.  It was built in 1918 by master stonemason H.T. Pugh.

References

See also

 List of National Historic Landmarks in Idaho
 National Register of Historic Places listings in Jerome County, Idaho

Houses in Jerome County, Idaho
Houses on the National Register of Historic Places in Idaho
Houses completed in 1918
National Register of Historic Places in Jerome County, Idaho